Wendy Williams (21 April 1942 – 3 March 2012) was a Welsh cricketer who played as a right-arm medium bowler. She appeared in 6 One Day Internationals for International XI at the 1973 World Cup. She played domestic cricket for West Midlands.

References

External links

1942 births
2012 deaths
International XI women One Day International cricketers
Welsh women cricketers
West Midlands women cricketers